Author is a Czech brand of bicycles, bike accessories and sporting goods.

The brand was founded in 1993. The company manufactures bicycles in the following categories: road bikes, mountain bikes (cross-country, enduro, full suspension), cross-country bicycles, touring, freestyle (MTB, BMX), junior and women's (mountain bikes, cross-country). Author also manufactures e-bikes.

Sport
Author supports the racing teams Voster ATS Team, Author Author Gang - 4cross/BMX (Michal Prokop, Luke Tammy), triathlon team Author Tufo Zlín (Peter Vabroušek) PSK Whirlpool - Author (Peter Benčík) and Alpine Pro - Author Team (Václav Ježek).

External links

Cycle manufacturers of the Czech Republic
Mountain bike manufacturers
Manufacturing companies established in 1993
Czech brands